Barnstable State Forest is a Massachusetts state forest located in Barnstable. The forest is managed by the Department of Conservation and Recreation (DCR).

See also
List of Massachusetts state forests

References

External links
Mentioning of the forest on a flood map

Barnstable, Massachusetts
Massachusetts state forests
Protected areas of Barnstable County, Massachusetts